Indian Institute of Technology Roorkee (abbreviated IIT Roorkee)  is a technical university located in Roorkee,  Uttarakhand, India.  It is the oldest engineering institution in India, and was founded as the College of Civil Engineering in British India in 1847 by the Lieutenant-Governor of the North-Western Provinces, James Thomason,  in order to train officers and surveyors employed in the construction of the Ganges Canal. In 1854, after the completion of the canal and Thomason's death, it was renamed the Thomason College of Civil Engineering by Proby Cautley, the designer and projector of the canal.  It was renamed University of Roorkee in 1949, and again renamed IIT Roorkee in 2001.  The institution has 22 academic departments covering Engineering, Applied Sciences, Humanities & Social Sciences and Management programs with an emphasis on scientific and technological education and research.

History

The institution was founded in 1847 by James Thomason, the Lieutenant-Governor of the North-Western Provinces (in which Roorkee then lay) to aid engineers and surveyors at work in the construction of the Ganges Canal. It offered instruction catered to a variety of students; this included an engineering class for the domiciled British and some Indians; an upper subordinates class for British noncommissioned officers; and a lower subordinates class for Indian surveyors.  By the mid-1880s, "the school has a hundred students, substantial buildings, and a reputation as an important center for the study of hydraulic engineering."

An Electrical Engineering department was added in 1897.  The architecture department instituted a master's degree course in Architecture (M. Arch.) in 196970.

In 1978, the Institute of Paper Technology, Saharanpur was merged with the then University of Roorkee. The Institute of Paper Technology was established as School of Paper Technology by the Government of India in 1964, with an aid from the Royal Swedish Government. The school was renamed as the Institute of Paper Technology in July 1968 and subsequently Department of Paper Technology in July 1992.

The first edition of Thomso, the institute's annual cultural festival was held in 1982. In 1997 the government of India released a stamp dedicated to 150th anniversary of university of Roorkee. 

On 21 September 2001, an ordinance issued by the Government of India declared it as the nation's seventh Indian Institute of Technology, renaming it to the current name, Indian Institute of Technology Roorkee. The ordinance was converted into an act by the Parliament to make IIT Roorkee an "Institution of National Importance". To mark 175 years of the establishment of the Indian Institute of Technology (IIT), Roorkee, the central government issued a Rs 175 coin.

Campus

In addition to this, a new ten-acre campus has been established in Greater Noida, Knowledge Park II, which was inaugurated on 4 April 2011. The Noida extension centre has 16 lecture rooms, software laboratories, faculty offices, a library and a computer center.

Most students live in the hostels, where extracurricular activities complement the academic routine. The campus has 16 hostels, of which two (Sarojini, Kasturba ) are occupied by girls. The campus has a new co-ed hostel, Vigyan Kunj. Hostels may accommodate undergraduate and graduate students along with doctoral students. Students are assigned to hostels by the school administration after their freshmen year. There are nine hostels for married students, doctoral students and foreign students. Each bhawan has a mess. Mess administration consists of a staff advisor, a chief advisor, and a student mess secretary.

Organization and administration

Governance

All IITs follow the same organization structure which has President of India as visitor at the top of the hierarchy. Directly under the president is the IIT Council. Under the IIT Council is the board of governors of each IIT.
Under the board of governors is the director, who is the chief academic and executive officer of the IIT. Under the director, in the organizational structure, comes the deputy director. Under the director and the deputy director, come the deans, heads of departments, registrar.

Departments and Centers
IIT Roorkee is one of the biggest technical institutions in the country having the largest number of academic units. It has 21 academic departments covering engineering, applied sciences, humanities & social sciences, and management programmes, 1 academic center, 3 centers of excellence, 5 academic service centers and 3 supporting units.

 Departments
 Engineering and Applied Sciences
 Architecture and Planning
 Applied Science and Engineering
 Biosciences and Bioengineering
 Chemical Engineering
 Chemistry
 Civil Engineering
 Computer Science and Engineering
 Earthquake Engineering 
 Earth Sciences 
 Electrical Engineering
 Electronics and Communication Engineering
 Humanities and Social Sciences
 Hydrology
 Hydro and Renewable Energy
 Management Studies
 Mathematics
 Mechanical and Industrial Engineering
 Metallurgical and Materials Engineering
 Paper Technology
 Polymer and Process Engineering
 Physics 
 Water Resources Development and Management
 Sciences
 Physics
 Chemistry
 Mathematics

 Business
 Management Studies
 Humanities
 Humanities and Social Sciences

 Centers
Centre of Excellence
Centre of Nanotechnology
Centre for Transportation Systems (CTRANS)
Centre of Excellence in Disaster Mitigation & Management (CoEDMM)
 Academic Service centers
 Mahatma Gandhi Central Library
 Centre of Nanotechnology
 Centre for Transportation Systems
 Centre of Excellence in Disaster Mitigation & Management
 Continuing Education Centre
 Institute Computer Centre
 Institute Instrumentation Centre
 Intellectual Property Rights Cell
 Quality Improvement Programme
 Supporting Service Centers
 Educational Technology Cell
 Institute Hospital

Academics
IIT Roorkee offers academic programmes in Engineering, Technology, Applied Sciences, and Management. It runs eleven undergraduate (UG), one integrated dual degree, sixty one postgraduate (PG) and several doctoral programmes.

The institute admits students to B.Tech., B.Arch. and integrated M.Sc.  integrated M.Tech courses through the Joint Entrance Examination (JEE) conducted at centers all over India. Before being converted into an IIT, the university selected students through the Roorkee Entrance Exam (REE) conducted on an All-India level. The selectivity of REE was close to 0.25%. After IIT-JEE, it was considered to be the second toughest engineering entrance examination in India. Admission to PG programmes in engineering and architecture is on the basis of GATE score and/or a written test and interview. For PG programmes in fundamental sciences admission is based on the Joint Admission Test (JAM).

Along with the engineering courses, the institute offers a two-year residential MBA program for which the admissions, starting from 2011, will be done on the basis of Common Admission Test, thus replacing Joint Management Entrance Test (JMET) previously conducted by the IITs. The institute also offered an interdisciplinary program in computer applications leading to a degree in Master of computer applications (MCA). The MCA program was a three-year course and admission for the course was through JAM. This programme has been discontinued.

According to statistics published by institute in 200708 4137 students were enrolled in the institute across all programs. The student-to-academic-staff ratio was 2.6:1 and that of UG/PG students was 1.4:1.

Rankings
 

Internationally, IIT Roorkee was ranked 369 in the QS World University Rankings of 2023 and 114 in Asia. It was ranked 701–800 in the Academic Ranking of World Universities of 2022.

In India, it ranked sixth among engineering colleges by the National Institutional Ranking Framework in 2020  and ninth overall.

The Department of Management Studies ranked 12th among management schools in India by the National Institutional Ranking Framework in 2020.

Library

An ISO 9001:2008 certified academic service centre in 2015, The Mahatma Gandhi Central Library finds a unique place in the academic spectrum of the institute. Started in 1848 with a few hundred donated books, its collection has grown to more than 3,50,000 documents in all media. The library contains rare manuscripts including a 1623 edition of William Shakespeare’s complete works. Providing information through e-resources is the main focus of the Library. It has around 90,000 sq ft of fully air-conditioned space. It can accommodate more than 500 readers at any point of time. The library building is WiFi enabled and contains a total 75 user terminals, dedicated for readers. It also contains an 80-seater open reading room.

Research
Research activities at the institute are conducted at either the department level or under the central office of Sponsored Research and Industrial Consultancy (SRIC). Major research funding was awarded by several ministries and departments of the Government of India, including the Ministry of Communications and Information Technology (India), Ministry of New and Renewable Energy and others. Apart from these, a number of major research organizations who have awarded projects to IIT Roorkee include the Council of Scientific and Industrial Research, Indian Space Research Organisation and others. The State Emergency Operation Centre(SEOC) in Dehradun
is planning to soon link data centre of an earthquake early warning system developed by IIT Roorkee with the State Emergency Operation Centre (SEOC) in Dehradun which would come as a great recognition for the establishment.

Academic collaboration
IIT Roorkee's contribution towards the international community in science and technology include the courses and training programs run for developing countries. Every year students from more than 50 countries join IIT Roorkee for full-time or short-term training courses. In 1955 the department of Water Resources Development and Management (WRDM) was established as an Asian African Centre to honour India's commitment at the Asian African Conference held in Bandung. WRDM and the Department of Hydrology run special postgraduate programmes for students of the Afro Asian region. The department has so far trained over 2469 in service engineers and agricultural scientists from 48 countries including India. The courses offered by the Department of Hydrology are presently sponsored by the Government of India and the UNESCO. In 2008 IIT Roorkee tied up with Google for academic collaboration and curriculum development on emerging technologies and digital landscape led by Siddhartha Paul Tiwari.

Research organizations in India which have a MOU with IIT Roorkee include Indian Institute of Petroleum, Dehradun; Department of Atomic Engineering (DAE), Mumbai; Intel Technology India Pvt. Ltd.; Aryabhatta Research Institute of Observational Sciences (ARIES), Nainital among others.

Scholarships and Prizes

Types of Awards and Scholarships

1. Non-Convocation Awards/Scholarship: These awards and scholarship are given to current students of various classes. Mostly these awards are based on criteria decided by donors.

 Type A1 Based on Academic Performance. 
 Type A2 Based on Various Other Achievements. 

2. Convocation Awards/Scholarship: These awards and scholarship are distributed during convocation ceremony to the graduating students. Some of these awards are given on the basis of academic performance while many are given on different criteria proposed by donors.

 Type A1 Based on Academic Performance. 
 Type A2 Based on Academic Performance and other various activities.

3. Merit-cum-Means Scholarship: MCM scholarship is given to those students who are meritorious but financially constraint.

Student life

Cultural festivals
Students conduct four fests every year: Cognizance (technical festival), Thomso (cultural festival), Sangram (sports festival) and National Social Summit  (social festival).

Student groups and clubs
Student groups on the campus include STIFKI (Student Teacher Interaction Forum for Knowledge and Innovation), IMG (Information Management Group), SDSLabs (Software Development Section Labs), GIL (Group for Interactive Learning), EDC (Entrepreneurship Development Cell), HEC (Himalayan Explorers' Club), Literary Society (Active involvement in debating and quizzing), a local chapter of ShARE, Spic Macay in addition to student chapters of technical societies such as AAPG, SEG, SPG, ASME (American Society of Mechanical Engineers, IIT Roorkee Student Section), SAE, IEEE, IIChE (Indian Institute of Chemical Engineers), etc. The Cultural Society (dramatics, music, choreography, cinematic, literary, IIT Heartbeat(Official inter-IIT magazine)), audio, lights, Programme management, Kshitij, Geek Gazette(technical magazine of IIT Roorkee) Watch Out (the Official News Magazine of IIT Roorkee) takes all initiative related to cultural activities in the institute. It organizes music concerts, dance shows, dramas and quiz competitions.
 National Service Scheme at IIT Roorkee is headed by Dean of Students Welfare, IIT Roorkee. As of 2014, NSS, IIT Roorkee has over 700 active members from different disciplines, participating and organizing various community and social service activities.

IIT Roorkee has a hobbies club, one of its kind among IITs. It aims at facilitating activities like photography, philately, astronomy, fine arts, gardening, web design, etc. It is headed by a chief advisor, who is supported by two deputy chief advisors and a council secretary. It hosts SRISHTI, an annual techno-hobby exhibition.

Team Robocon, is the official undergraduate student competitive robotics team of IIT Roorkee. It was founded in 2009 by some robotic enthusiasts alumni. This team annually participates in ABU Robocon Competition. The team has won multiple awards in the past like the "Best Innovative Design Award" in 2018 and the "Judges Special Award" in 2019. The team has achieved AIR-5 in 2016, AIR-7 in 2018, and AIR-6 in 2019. Their aim is to win the national competition by making the best robot and represent India in the corresponding international event.

IIT Roorkee Motorsports is the official Formula Student team of IIT Roorkee. It was founded in August 2010. The team designed and developed a formula style race car and represented India in the international competition Formula SAE Australasia in December 2011, held in Melbourne, Australia. This was the first Indian team to finish the endurance event of the competition and also finished first in fuel efficiency. The team also enjoys the rare feat of displaying their student-made race car at Auto Expo 2012. After a successful international debut, the team has plans to develop a series hybrid vehicle and participate in the Formula Student UK 2013.

The institute hosted the inception of SPIC MACAY Winter Convention. A cultural and classical program in which students from school and colleges from all over the country collaborated which was held from 13 to 16 December 2015. Aman Jakar was the overall convener of the event.

Commemoration
The 150th anniversary of the institution was commemorated in a stamp issued by the Government of India in 1997.  In 2022, its 175th anniversary was commemorated by a coin.

Alumni
IIT Roorkee has produced many alumni who played important roles in the technological development of India and made significant impact on corporate world. According to IIT Roorkee's website, ten alumni have won Padma awards and 25 have been Shanti Swarup Bhatnagar Prize for Science and Technology awardees. The institute has produced seven chairmen of the Indian Railway Board, chairman of the Telecom Regulatory Authority of India, chief of Delhi Metro Rail Corporation, more than a hundred secretary-level officers in the Government of India, two presidents of the Confederation of Indian Industry, six directors of IITs, and presidents of bodies related to engineers and scientists like the Indian Institution of Engineers, the Indian National Science Academy and the Indian National Academy of Engineering.

Notable alumni

Alumni association
The IIT Roorkee Alumni Association was established and registered in 1940 as a society under the Society Registration Act. The association has 31 local chapters in the country and three chapters abroad. The association encourages the alumni to take interest in the activities of the alma mater and promotes relations between alumni.

Every year the association hosts Diamond, Golden and Silver jubilee functions, where alumni graduating 60, 50 and 25 years earlier are invited. Since 2005 the association has also been awarding a Distinguished Alumni Award to alumni who have made immense contributions in the fields of Academic/Research, Social Sciences, Engineering & Public Administration, Corporate Development/Entrepreneurship and Service to the Society.

The Student Alumni Mentorship Programme has been initiated by the association to help young students in achieving their career aspirations. The alumni visit the institute to interact with the students and staff and share their suggestions.

See also
 Indian Institutes of Technology
 National Institutes of Technology
 Indian Institutes of Information Technology

Notes

References

Further reading

External links

 

 
Educational institutions established in 1847
1847 establishments in British India
Education in Roorkee
Engineering colleges in Uttarakhand
Universities and colleges in Uttarakhand

de:Indian Institute of Technology